Amroha railway station is a main railway station in Amroha district, Uttar Pradesh established in 1885. Its code is AMRO. It serves Amroha city. The station consists of three platforms. The platforms are not well sheltered. It lacks many facilities including water and sanitation.

The station is situated on the Delhi–Moradabad line by Oudh and Rohilkhand Railway and all passenger trains and most of the express trains stop here.

Trains 
Some of the trains that run from Amroha are:

 Sadbhawna Express
 Ala Hazrat Express
 Avadh Assam Express
 New Delhi–Bareilly Intercity Express
 Himachal Express
 Kashi Vishwanath Express
 Nauchandi Express
 Lucknow–Chandigarh Express (via Gajraula)
 Saryu Yamuna Express
 Shaheed Express
 Loknayak Express
 Satyagraha Express
 Anand Vihar–Moradabad MEMU
 Shahjahanpur–Delhi Passenger
 Meerut City–Lucknow Rajya Rani Express
 Uttarakhand Sampark Kranti Express

References

Railway stations in Amroha district
Moradabad railway division
Amroha